Sam Rivers may refer to:

 Sam Rivers (jazz musician) (1923-2011), American jazz musician and composer
 Sam Rivers (bassist) (born 1977), bassist and backing vocalist of the band Limp Bizkit

See also
Samuel Rivers Jr. (born 1970), American politician